The Hatimura Temple is a Hindu temple (Shakti Pitha), located at  Hatimura Post office Jakhalabandha, Nagaon district of Assam, India. It was built during the reign of Ahom king Pramatta Singha in 1667 Sakabda (1745-46 AD). It used to be an important center of Shaktism in ancient Assam. The presiding goddess is Durga which is known here as Mahisamardini. Human sacrifice was said to be made at the temple's altars.

References

Hindu temples in Assam
Durga temples
Nagaon
1667 establishments in Asia